Colonel Thomas Richard Beaumont (29 April 1758 – 31 July 1829) of Bretton Hall, Wakefield, Yorkshire, was a British Tory politician and soldier.

Origins
He was the son of Thomas Beaumont of The Oaks in Darton, Yorkshire, by his wife Anne Ayscough, daughter of Edward Ayscough.

Career
In 1794 Beaumont raised the 21st Light Dragoons and served as the regiment's colonel until 1802. He entered the British House of Commons in 1795 and sat for Northumberland first in the Parliament of Great Britain, then in Parliament of the United Kingdom until 1818.

Marriage and children
Beaumont married Diana Wentworth (1765–1831), daughter of Sir Thomas Wentworth, 5th Baronet, by whom he had three daughters and five sons, including Thomas Wentworth Beaumont, eldest son, also MP for Northumberland, and the ancestor of Baron Allendale and Viscount Allendale.

The genus of plant in the Apocynaceae family was named Beaumontia in Diana Wentworth Beaumont's honour as she was a botanical patron.

Death and burial
Beaumont died at his seat Bretton Hall in Yorkshire.

References

External links

1758 births
1829 deaths
British MPs 1790–1796
British MPs 1796–1800
Members of the Parliament of Great Britain for English constituencies
Members of the Parliament of the United Kingdom for English constituencies
UK MPs 1801–1802
UK MPs 1802–1806
UK MPs 1806–1807
UK MPs 1807–1812
UK MPs 1812–1818
British Army officers
British Army personnel of the Napoleonic Wars